Forethought, Inc. was a computer software company, best known as developers of what is now Microsoft PowerPoint.

History
In late 1983, Rob Campbell and Taylor Pohlman founded Forethought, Inc in order to develop object-oriented bit-mapped application software. In 1984, they hired Robert Gaskins, a former Ph.D. student at the University of California, Berkeley, in exchange for a large percentage of the company's stock. He and software developer Dennis Austin led the development of a program called Presenter, which they later renamed PowerPoint. Also in 1984, Forethought acquired the rights to publish a Macintosh version of a DOS-based application called Nutshell. They named the Mac version FileMaker and it soon became enormously successful.

PowerPoint 1.0 was released in 1987 for the Apple Macintosh. It ran in black and white, generating text-and-graphics pages for overhead transparencies. A new full-color version of PowerPoint shipped a year later after the first color Macintosh came to market. Later in 1987, Forethought and PowerPoint were purchased by Microsoft Corporation for $14 million. In May 1990 the first Windows 3.0 versions were produced. Since 1990, PowerPoint has been a standard part of the Microsoft Office suite of applications except for the Basic Edition. Microsoft PowerPoint would go on to become the most used and sought after presentation suite, having a 95% market share.

References

Defunct software companies of the United States

1983 establishments in the United States
Software companies established in 1983
Microsoft acquisitions